Sir Swinton Barclay Thomas (12 January 1931 – 12 August 2016) was a British judge, privy councillor, and the Interception of Communications Commissioner. He raised questions about the scope of the Wilson Doctrine. He was born in Glasgow, the son of Brigadier William Bain Thomas  of the Cameronians (Scottish Rifles), in which regiment Swinton carried out his National Service.

Thomas was a prominent Roman Catholic layman who served as chairman of the Association of Papal Orders in Great Britain.

Notable judgments of his included:
 Medforth v Blake
 Rock (Nominees) Ltd v RCO Holdings Ltd
 Weathersfield Ltd v Sargeant

References 

20th-century English judges
Lawyers from Glasgow
Members of the Privy Council of the United Kingdom
1931 births
2016 deaths
People educated at Ampleforth College
Cameronians officers
British Roman Catholics
Alumni of Lincoln College, Oxford
Presidents of the Oxford University Conservative Association
Knights Bachelor
Queen's Bench Division judges
Lords Justices of Appeal